Pere Guerrero Torrecilla (born June 5, 1973 in La Seu d'Urgell) is a Spanish slalom canoeist who competed in the 1990s. He finished 28th in the C1 event at the 1992 Summer Olympics in Barcelona.

World Cup individual podiums

References
 Sports-reference.com profile

1973 births
Canoeists at the 1992 Summer Olympics
Living people
Olympic canoeists of Spain
Spanish male canoeists
Sportspeople from the Province of Lleida
People from Alt Urgell